This article is about the list of Académico do Aeroporto do Sal players.   Académico do Aeroporto is a Cape Verdean football (soccer) club based in Espargos, Cape Verde and plays at Estádio Marcelo Leitão.  The club was formed on 1 December 1966.

List of players

Notes

References

Académico do Aeroporto
Academico Aeroporto
Association football player non-biographical articles